Elmar Korko (8 February 1908 – 10 July 1941) was an Estonian rower. He competed in the men's single sculls event at the 1936 Summer Olympics. He was executed by Soviet soldiers during World War II.

References

1908 births
1941 deaths
Estonian male rowers
Olympic rowers of Estonia
Rowers at the 1936 Summer Olympics
Sportspeople from Tartu
Estonian people executed by the Soviet Union